Dale Fulton (born 11 September 1992) is a Scottish professional footballer who previously played for Falkirk, Clyde and Stirling Albion

Career

Falkirk
Fulton made his first team debut on 30 July 2011 as a substitute in Falkirk's 4 -2 win over Albion Rovers in the Scottish League Cup. His first league start came on 6 August 2011, against Raith Rovers at Starks Park. He went on to make 12 more appearances for Falkirk in season 2011–12. During the 2012–13 season, he made 11 appearances in total, with his last outing in a Falkirk shirt coming at the same venue he made his league debut for the club, playing in a 0–0 draw against Raith Rovers at Stark's Park.

Clyde (loan)
On 13 January 2012, Fulton joined Scottish Third Division side Clyde on a month's loan deal. He made his league debut the following day, starting against Montrose.

Stirling Albion
On 8 August 2013, Fulton joined Scottish League Two side Stirling Albion along with former Falkirk teammate David Weatherston. He scored just 6 minutes into his debut on 10 August 2013, in a 2–1 victory over Montrose.

On 23 January 2015, Fulton left Stirling Albion.

Personal life
Fulton's father is former Celtic, Falkirk and Hearts player Steve Fulton. His brother Jay Fulton plays for Swansea City.

Career statistics

References

External links

1992 births
Living people
Footballers from Greenock
Association football midfielders
Falkirk F.C. players
Clyde F.C. players
Stirling Albion F.C. players
Scottish Football League players
Scottish Professional Football League players
Scottish footballers